Wisconsin Badgers ice hockey may refer to either of the ice hockey teams that represent the University of Wisconsin–Madison:

Wisconsin Badgers men's ice hockey
Wisconsin Badgers women's ice hockey